Miloš Perić (born 27 July 1990) is a Serbian footballer who plays as a goalkeeper for Icelandic third-tier side Haukar.

Club career
Born in Aleksinac, Perić debuted for the first team of Radnički Niš at the age of 18. He made 6 Serbian First League caps for the next season. After Radnički relegated to the Serbian League East, Perić spent some period as a loaned player with local club Sinđelić. Returning in the club, he was mostly used as a reserve choice for experienced Zoran Vasković until the 2012–13 season, when got a chance from the 2nd fixture of the competition making his Serbian SuperLiga debut. He spent the rest of half-season as a first goalkeeper, and was nominated for the best player of the half-season by the fans choice. Later, after Aleksandar Kesić joined the club in the winter break off-season, Perić moved on the bench. He also played several matches before the end of season. Later, he was out of the team mostly time until the end of contact with Radnički, and spent mostly time as a loaned player in other clubs until 2015. In summer 2016, Perić returned in his home club.

Perić was loaned to Sinđelić, where he spent some period during the 2009–10 Serbian League East season. After the 2013–14 season, without matches for Radnički Niš, Miloš was loaned to Radnik Surdulica for the first half of new season, but he spent mostly time as a reserve for Bojan Šejić, making just 1 league and 1 cup match. At the beginning of 2015, Perić moved to Radnički Pirot, where he spent the whole year. The first half of year he spent as a loaned player of Radnički Niš, and later he joined the club as a single player. After returning to Radnički Niš in summer 2016, Perić moved on one-year loan to Car Konstantin. In April 2017, Perić moved to the Icelandic side Fjarðabyggðar, where he collected 21 matches in the 2017 2. deild karla as also 2 matches in the domestic cup. Returning to the Serbian League East side Car Konstantin as a single player for the 2017–18 season, Perić was elected for the best goalkeeper of the tournament "Čukarica 2018".

Statistics

Honours
Radnički Niš
 Serbian League East (2): 2008–09, 2010–11
 Serbian First League: 2011–12
Sinđelić Niš
 Serbian League East: 2009–10
Radnik Surdulica
Serbian First League: 2014–15
Radnički Pirot
Serbian League East: 2015–16

References

External links
 Miloš Perić stats at utakmica.rs 
 
 
 
 

Living people
1990 births
People from Aleksinac
Association football goalkeepers
Serbian footballers
FK Radnički Niš players
FK Sinđelić Niš players
FK Radnik Surdulica players
FK Radnički Pirot players
FK Car Konstantin players
Haukar men's football players
Serbian First League players
Serbian SuperLiga players
2. deild karla players
Serbian expatriate footballers
Expatriate footballers in Iceland
Serbian expatriate sportspeople in Iceland